Jan-Luca Rumpf (born 8 July 1999) is a German professional footballer who plays as a centre-back for SC Fortuna Köln.

Career
Rumpf made his professional debut for SC Paderborn in the Bundesliga on 13 June 2020, starting in the home match against Werder Bremen.

References

External links
 
 
 
 

1999 births
Living people
Sportspeople from Wiesbaden
Footballers from Hesse
German footballers
Association football central defenders
Hannover 96 II players
Sportfreunde Siegen players
SC Paderborn 07 II players
SC Paderborn 07 players
SC Fortuna Köln players
Bundesliga players
Regionalliga players